Zurich University may refer to:

University of Zurich, founded in 1833
Zurich University of Applied Sciences/ZHAW, founded in 2007.